The Blair Building, also known as the Blair and Company Building,  was one of New York City's earliest skyscrapers.

History 
It was constructed in 1902–1903. It was located at 24 Broad Street in the Financial District of Manhattan, New York City, and had a white marble facade. It was built by Andrew J. Robinson Company. The Architectural Record ran an article about it in 1903 titled "A Beaux-Arts Skyscraper". It was demolished in 1955.

It was designed by Carrere and Hastings and Edwin Thayer Barlow of the firm was the supervising architect for construction. Henry W. Post was the building's structural engineer. He also worked on the Gillender Building.

In 1928 the building was purchased to be part of the expanding New York Stock Exchange Building complex. Irving Underhill photographed the building in 1932.

It was next to the adjoining Commercial Cable Building built in 1897 at 20 Broad Street.

See also
John Insley Blair
DeWitt Clinton Blair 
C. Ledyard Blair

References

External links
Archival photos of the Blair Building Art Institute of Chicago

1903 establishments in New York City
1955 disestablishments in New York (state)
Beaux-Arts architecture in New York City
Commercial buildings completed in 1903
Buildings and structures demolished in 1955
Demolished buildings and structures in Manhattan
Financial District, Manhattan
Former skyscrapers
Skyscrapers in Manhattan